Beyond All Sense 2005 is Destiny's sixth album, a re-recording of their 1985 album Beyond All Sense, and was released on May 11, 2005. The original album was only released in Sweden in a limited number of 2000 copies of vinyl.

Most of the music on the album was written by former Destiny guitarists Magnus Österman and John Prodén, and lyrics were largely from former Destiny singer Håkan Ring. "Lost to Heaven" (acoustic) and "Destiny" from the 1985 album were replaced by two previously unreleased bonus tracks. "Ode to You", originally written in 1983 and called "Please Don't Go", was rewritten by vocalist Kristoffer Göbel as a tribute to Dimebag Darrell after his 2004 death. The second bonus track, "No Way Out" (originally "He Is Free"), was cut from the 1985 album due to the time limit on vinyls and was rewritten by Göbel for the 2005 album. The rewritten song was about Ozzy Osbourne and reality TV shows.

Track listing

Disc 2 bonus tracks include a video of "In the Shadow of the Rainbow" from Future of the Past; a medley of the songs "Holy Man", "Sabotage", and "Future of the Past", with live footage from the 2005 release party in Gothenburg; review from the Future of the Past release party; quotes from reviews of the album Future of the Past; discography; bonus DVD produced by Pixel Productions; and a video of "In the Shadow of the Rainbow" by Astronaut.

Credits

Main personnel
 Kristoffer Göbel - vocals, writer
 Stefan Björnshög - bass, composer
 Janne Ekberg - guitar, sound engineering
 Birger Löfman - drums

Additional credits
 Mathias Rosén - keyboard on "Power by Birth"
 Linus Wikström - harmony guitar on "Sirens in the Dark"
 Fredrik Olsson - guitar
 Janne Olsson - guitar
 Mats Olausson - keyboard on "Beyond All Sense"
 Christian Silver - mixing, sound engineering
 Dragan Tanasković - mastering
 Christer Lindblad - sound engineering
 Bengt Grönkvist - cover art
 Staffan Falkenström/Pixel Productions - 3D artwork and logo
 Conny Myrberg - photography
 Ken Olsson - photography
 Kenneth Johansson - photography

References

2005 albums
Destiny (band) albums
Heavy metal albums by Swedish artists